ASP-7663 is a chemical compound which acts as a potent, selective activator of the TRPA1 channel. It has protective effects on cardiac tissue, and is used for research into the function of the TRPA1 receptor.

See also
 JT-010
 PF-4840154

References

Transient receptor potential channel agonists